Anna Semyonovna Gourari (Russian Анна Семёновна Гурарий, born in Kazan, Tatarstan, Russia) is a German classical concert pianist.

She received her first piano education at the age of five from her parents, professors at Kazan Academy of Music. In 1979 she performed her first public concert. From that year onwards she studied at further renowned piano schools and with famous piano tutors. In 1990 she relocated together with her parents to Germany in order to study at the Hochschule für Musik with Ludwig Hoffmann in Munich.
Anna Gourari quickly gained renown by winning important competitions:

 1986 1st prize at the Kabalevsky competition in Russia
 1989 1st prize at the First International Chopin competition in Göttingen.
 1994 1st prize at the First International Clara-Schumann-Klavierconcours in Düsseldorf. Jury: Martha Argerich, Alexis Weissenberg, Nelson Freire, Vladimir Ashkenazy a.o.

This last prize marked the beginning of her international acceptance. As of that year, Gourari has played a significant role on the international concert scene. She often performs together with leading orchestras under conductors such as Lorin Maazel, Zubin Mehta, etc.

In 2001 she played a star role in Werner Herzog's movie Invincible.

Gourari is regarded as unconventional; her playing involves a mystical approach, but is most notably very accurate.

2007 she made six reportages about Moscow's current art and society for "Deutsche Welle TV".

2009 Album of Johannes Brahms: The Late Piano Pieces, opp. 116–119
2010 Album of Mazurkas by Chopin: The Mazurka Diary

Anna Gourari has a daughter and lives with her family in Munich.

Discography 

 Chopin (Piano Sonata No.3, Mazurkas) - 1998
 Scriabin (Preludes) - 1999
 Richard Strauss (Piano Concertos for the Left Hand) with Bamberg Symphony Orchestra, Karl Anton Rickenbacher - 2001
 Chopin (Scherzi etc.) - 2001
 Beethoven (Piano Concerto No.3, Sonata No. 8, c-minor, "Pathétique", 32 Variations) with Staatskapelle Dresden, Sir Colin Davis - 2001 (Cover with movie scene)
 Nocturnes - 2003
 Desir (Scriabin, Gubaidulina) - 2005
 Brahms: The Late Piano Pieces (opp. 116–119) - 2009
 Canto Oscuro - 2012, ECM New Series 2255
 Visions fugitives - 2014, ECM New Series 2384
 Elusive Affinity - 2019, ECM 2612

External links 
 http://www.gourari.com official website
 http://members.aol.com/schumannga/1ccs.htm live recording at Clara Schumann competition

Living people
Studienstiftung alumni
German classical pianists
Women classical pianists
Musicians from Kazan
Soviet emigrants to Germany
21st-century classical pianists
Year of birth missing (living people)